John Lister (died 19 January 1616) was an English lead merchant and politician who sat in the House of Commons  in 1601

Lister was a lead merchant of Hull and in about 1590 he purchased a plot of land on the High Street overlooking the River Hull. He was a member of Hull Corporation and became an alderman and was mayor of Hull in 1592. Lister  was elected Member of Parliament for Kingston upon Hull (Hull) in 1601.

Lister died in 1616 and was buried in Holy Trinity Church in Hull.

Lister married Anne Gayton, daughter of Robert Gayton. Their son John was also MP for Hull.

The  house of the Lister family is now a museum known as the Wilberforce House Museum.

References

 

Date of birth unknown
1616 deaths
English MPs 1601
English merchants
Mayors of Kingston upon Hull
16th-century English businesspeople
17th-century English businesspeople
16th-century merchants
17th-century merchants